Bill Williams (22 September 1904 – 3 February 1993) was an Australian rules footballer who played with Fitzroy in the Victorian Football League (VFL).

Notes

External links 

1904 births
1993 deaths
Australian rules footballers from Tasmania
Fitzroy Football Club players
Glenorchy Football Club players